D'Aguilar is a rural town and locality in the Moreton Bay Region, Queensland, Australia.

It is located northwest of the larger centre of Caboolture.

Geography

D'Aguilar lies on the D'Aguilar Highway between Wamuran and Woodford.  It is also the northern endpoint of Brisbane–Woodford Road (Mount Mee Road), which leads south through Delaneys Creek and Mount Mee to Dayboro. A small section of the Beerburrum West State Forest is in D'Aguilar.

History

The town is named for Major General Sir George D'Aguilar, a military officer who wrote Regulations and Punishments of the British Army, the army textbook in use at the time of the town's establishment.  As time passed, the mountain range that the town is situated in came to be named after the town.

References

External links

 
 

Suburbs of Moreton Bay Region
Localities in Queensland